The Roman Catholic Diocese of Valença is a diocese located in the city of Valença, Rio de Janeiro, in the Ecclesiastical province of São Sebastião do Rio de Janeiro in Brazil.

History
 27 March 1925: Established as Diocese of Valença from the Diocese of Barra do Piraí

Bishops
 Bishops of Valença (Roman rite), in reverse chronological order
 Bishop Nelson Francelino Ferreira (2014.02.12 - present)
 Bishop Elias James Manning, O.F.M. Conv. (1990.03.14 – 2014.02.12)
 Bishop Amaury Castanho (1979.11.30 – 1989.05.03), appointed Coadjutor Bishop of Jundiaí, São Paulo
 Bishop José Costa Campos (1960.12.09 – 1979.03.26), appointed Bishop of Divinópolis, Minas Gerais
 Bishop Rodolfo das Mercés de Oliveira Pena (1942.01.03 – 1960.12.09)
 Bishop René de Pontes (1938.10.13 – 1940.04.02)
 Bishop André Arcoverde de Albuquerque Cavalcanti (1925.05.01 – 1936.08.08), appointed Bishop of Taubaté, São Paulo

Other priest of this diocese who became bishop
Paulo Cezar Costa, appointed Auxiliary Bishop of São Sebastião do Rio de Janeiro in 2010

References
 GCatholic.org
 Catholic Hierarchy
 Diocese website (Portuguese)

Roman Catholic dioceses in Brazil
Christian organizations established in 1925
Valenca, Roman Catholic Diocese of
Roman Catholic dioceses and prelatures established in the 20th century